Debel dyal is a village in Gabrovo Municipality, in Gabrovo Province, in northern central Bulgaria.

Debel dyal is the birthplace of Lazarus Bulgarski (Bulg. Лазар Български), a Christian martyr born 1774, death April 23, 1802.

References

Villages in Gabrovo Province